Kolas Yotaka (born 17 March 1974), formerly Yeh Guan-lin, is an Amis Taiwanese politician and journalist. Since 2020, she has served as spokesperson for the Office of the President under Tsai Ing-wen. Kolas previously served as spokesperson for the Executive Yuan in 2018, the first Taiwanese aboriginal to hold the position.

As a journalist, Kolas has worked as a reporter for Formosa Television and as a news anchor for the Taiwan Indigenous Television. Kolas went on to become the director for the Aboriginal People's Administration of the Taoyuan City Government. In 2016, she was elected as a non-divisional legislator and an aboriginal affairs representative of the Democratic Progressive Party (DPP). In 2017, she was elected as a visiting scholar of the US Department of State's International Leadership Program.

Name 
The Pangcah people (aka Amis people) use patronymics or matronymics. Kolas' grandfather received the Japanese name Yoshinari during Japanese rule, and her father followed the tribal system with the name Yoshinari Yutaka (吉成豐). The family was assigned the Yo sound as the Chinese surname Yeh (葉) by the KMT government after Japanese rule ended. Kolas followed the system by using her father's given name as her second name, and thus got the name Kolas Yotaka. 

She changed her legal name on her household registration to her indigenous name around 2005–2006, after new legislation made it possible for indigenous people to do so. She uses the romanized Kolas Yotaka rather than the Chinese phonetic translation.

Early life 
She was born in Hsinchu City and belongs to the Amis Harawan tribe of Yuli, Hualien County. She obtained her bachelor's and master's degree in sociology from Tunghai University in 1996 and 1999, respectively.

Journalism career 
After completing her studies, she worked as a program producer and reporter on PTS and FTV. She also worked at weekly business magazine, Harvard Business Review and other magazines, as well as CNN Interactive English. She translated the book Routes: Travel and Translation the Late in Twentieth Century by anthropologist and historian James Clifford to Chinese.

From 2005 to 2013, she served as the assistant, producer and anchor at Taiwan Indigenous Television. She also served as the interview leader and the anchor for the English news. She was responsible for logistics, special planning, documentary filming and international news interviews. In 2007, while she was a producer and anchor of "Indigenous Peoples Evening News," the show received an Excellence in Journalism award. It was also nominated for the award in 2008 and 2011.

In 2014, she began producing and hosting the weekly international news program "Mata! See the World". She also produced 14 documentaries on indigenous activism. This series is called "Indigenous Movements". Several of her documentaries were nominated for and received a range of awards. "Wounds of Sami" was nominated for the 2012 Award for Excellence in Journalism, "The Death of Wufeng" won the silver at the 2013 Nepal International Aboriginal Film Festival, and "Fight for the Island-Punsu No Tao" was nominated for the 2014 International Uranium Film Festival in Rio.

Political career 

Kolas served as the director of the Aboriginal National Administrative Bureau of the Taoyuan City Government, the Ninth Legislative Yuan (representing the Democratic Progressive Party), and spokesperson for the Executive Yuan.

Aboriginal National Administrative Bureau of the Taoyuan City Government 
At the end of 2014, Cheng Wen-tsan, then mayor of Taoyuan City, appointed her as the first female director of the Aboriginal Administration of the Taoyuan City Government; and revised the name of the institution which has been used for 14 years to “Indigenous Peoples Administration Bureau”. It took effect on March 11, 2015 and required the name card to include aboriginal scripts.

Legislative Yuan 
In the 2016 general election, Kolas was elected as a legislator under the DPP. The Citizens Congress Watch rated her as an outstanding legislator in the Third Session. Sometimes she writes her legislative reports in Amis language.

On the eve of International Mother Language Day in 2016, Kolas promoted “mother language justice”, and proposed amendments to the “Names Regulations” and “Public Officials' Choice of Law”. It suggested that the name of the National Identity Card of the Republic of China can be used without Chinese characters, so other writing systems (such as tribal language orthography) can to used to register the name. It is possible to include both aboriginal languages and Chinese documents together on the election gazette. In mid-December of the same year, the draft Act on the Development of the Languages of Indigenous Peoples was proposed.

In May 2016, Kolas, Chen Chi-mai, and 17 other legislators proposed a bill to abolish the Mongolian and Tibetan Affairs Commission.

On 20 May 2016, 18 legislators including Kolas and Chen Qimai proposed the Draft Amendment to Article 16 of the Immigration and Immigration Law, which was passed on November 1, 2016.

On 5 September 2016, Kolas visited the Tibetan spiritual leader Dalai Lama in Dharamsala, India. She was the first Taiwanese aboriginal legislator to meet with the Dalai Lama. The Dalai Lama was very interested in the Amis sash on Kolas. He said that President Tsai Ing-wen's apology to the aborigines was "very good, it is a trend". On the following day, the Human Rights Network for Tibet and Taiwan held their first press conference in Dharamsala.

On 15 February 2017, Kolas accompanied a Taiwanese-Tibetan family to the Executive Yuan to submit a request; on the 20th of the same month, the Ministry of the Interior's Immigration Department abolished the principle of "collective review of the application for residence of Tibetan spouses holding Indian travel permits" and established  “following the Nationality and Immigration Act, Article 16, Item 4, Tibetan residents who have changed their nationality and hold Indian travel permit can apply for stay in Taiwan”.

On 23 April 2017, the Ministry of the Interior, at the request of the Kolas, canceled the ceremony of the Mausoleum of the Yellow Emperor, and the Central Government would no longer sent representatives of the Ministry to attend the Zheng Chenggong Festival, breaking the 54-year political convention and reflecting Taiwan's change in attitude to identity and multiculturalism.

On 17 June 2018, Kolas was invited by the Hawaiki Project (an Indigenous social initiative) to seek funding from the Council of Indigenous Peoples to allow New Zealand Māori children to come to Taiwan on 23 August 2018 for a 10-day origin trip and participate in traditional tribal ceremonies; and at the same time plan in mid-February 2019, allow Taiwanese aboriginal children go to New Zealand to experience Maori culture.

Executive Yuan spokesperson 
Because of her August 2014 drunk driving record, she has expressed her willingness to serve as an anti-drunk driving volunteer for life. KMT members of the Legislative Yuan argued with the social consensus of the "zero tolerance" policy for Kolas to be dismissed. Ho Hsin-chun, the head of the Democratic Progressive Party Committee, believes that a person who admits their mistake should be given the opportunity.

On 15 August 2018, when President Tsai Ing-wen passed through Los Angeles, she visited the local 85°C store. Therefore, 85 °C was bombarded by Chinese netizens as a “Taiwan independence enterprise”.  85 °C immediately issued a statement that they “Support the 1992 Consensus”. Kolas Yotaka said she "sympathize 85 °C very much" and also strongly condemns the use of self-righteous ideology in specific countries to suppress free markets and international companies.

On 22 August 2018, the Ngāti Manu tribe of the Maori in New Zealand visited Taiwan for a cultural trace. After arriving in Taiwan, the traditional leader (rangatira) Arapeta Hamilton led the team to the Executive Yuan to thank spokesperson Kolas Yotaka, expressing their excitement in finding a link between Maori culture and Taiwanese aboriginal culture.

On 20 September 2018, at the invitation of Queen Bilung Gloria Salii of the Republic of Palau, she participated in the "25th Anniversary Conference of the National Women's Conference" as the guest speaker. She was the first representative of the Taiwanese government to ever attend the conference.

Personal life 
In 2007, she was in a relationship with politician Icyang Parod. 

In March 2018, lawyer Jewel Chen implied online that Kolas was cohabiting with politician Icyang Parod, so Kolas sued her for defamation. On October 3, 2018, the Taiwan Taipei District Prosecutors Office pointed out that since representation of the electorate is elected by the public, the handling of public affairs, whether private or honest, will affect the purity and credit of the public office, so it must be criticized by the outside world. Even if there is a need for private inspection, it should be publicly available. In this matter, since it was implied, the lawsuit was dropped. On 6 October 2018, Kolas requested assistance from the Legal Aid Foundation with lawsuit. This action was subsequently criticized as a misuse of Legal Aid resources.

References 

1974 births
Living people
Tunghai University alumni
Members of the 9th Legislative Yuan
Democratic Progressive Party Members of the Legislative Yuan
Amis people
Politicians of the Republic of China on Taiwan from Hsinchu
Party List Members of the Legislative Yuan
Taiwanese politicians of indigenous descent
21st-century Taiwanese women politicians